The Gowlland Range is a low, small mountain range on southern Vancouver Island, British Columbia, Canada, located just east of Saanich Inlet and south of Brentwood Bay.

See also
List of mountain ranges

References

Vancouver Island Ranges
Saanich Peninsula